National Highway 765D, commonly referred to as NH 765D, is a national highway in India. NH-765D traverses the state of Telangana in India.

Route 
Hyderabad (junction at outer ring road) - Narsapur - Rampur - Medak.

Junctions  

 ORR, Hyderabad, Terminal near Gandimaisamma.
  Terminal near Narsapur.

Project development 
Union minister for Ministry of Road Transport and Highways laid the foundation stone for double laning of  national highway NH765D on 5 May 2018. Development of Hyderabad, ORR to Medak section of 62.92 km stretch is estimated to cost Rs 426.52 crores.

See also 

 List of National Highways in India
 List of National Highways in India by state

References

External links 
 NH 765D on OpenStreetMap

National highways in India
National Highways in Telangana